Darya Uladzimirauna Domracheva (born 3 August 1986) is a retired Belarusian biathlete and coach who competed in the Biathlon World Cup from 2006 to 2018. She won a gold medal in the 4×6 km relay and a silver medal in the mass start competition at the 2018 Winter Olympics, three gold medals in the pursuit, individual, and mass start competitions at the 2014 Winter Olympics, and a bronze medal in the individual competition at the 2010 Winter Olympics. She was a Biathlon World Cup overall winner for the 2014–15 season.

Career
Domracheva started her sports career with cross-country skiing in 1992 but switched to biathlon in 1999. She originally represented Russia at the junior level but received an offer to transfer to Belarus in 2004. She joined Belarus’ national biathlon team in 2006. Domracheva won sprint and pursuit at the 2005 IBU Youth and Junior World Championships in Kontiolahti (Finland). She finished 40th in the individual race.

Domracheva took 3rd place in the pursuit and 4th place in the individual events at the 2006 Junior World Championships in Presque Isle, Maine. In 2007, she picked up two silver medals in sprint and pursuit at the Junior World Championships in Martell, Italy.

Her breakthrough came during the 2008/2009 season when she earned two third places and one second place.

At the 2010 Winter Olympic Games in Vancouver, she won the bronze medal in the Women's 15-kilometer individual race at the Whistler Olympic Park venue. Later in the same season, on 13 March, she won her first World Cup race in the sprint in Kontiolahti, Finland. The next day she also won the pursuit.

Domracheva was named Belarus' Female Athlete of the Year in 2010, and was also given the title of Honoured Master of Sport that year.

She continued to improve after the Vancouver Olympics, winning 10 world cup races between the 2011–2013 seasons, as well as becoming the world champion in the pursuit in 2012, and the mass start in 2013. In 2014 Domracheva was given the Hero of Belarus medal, after winning three gold medals at the 2014 Winter Olympics.

In August 2015, Domracheva decided to skip the 2015–16 World Cup season due to mononucleosis which was diagnosed in July.

Domracheva confirmed her pregnancy in April 2016, and said that she plans to return to compete in 2017. Domracheva returned to the World Cup in January 2017 for the 2016–17 season. Her comeback ended up being successful, winning a silver medal at the 2017 world championships in the individual pursuit in preparation for the 2018 Winter Olympic Games. At the 2018 Winter Olympics, she was unable to defend her Olympic titles from Sochi; however she was still able to pick up a silver medal in the mass start individually, and helped the Belarusian team win the historic first Olympic gold medal in the relay. She finished the 2018 season ranked 3rd overall in the Biathlon World Cup, and announced her retirement in June, citing difficulties in combining both elite sport and parenting. She finished her career as Belarus’ most decorated winter Olympian, and most decorated Olympian of either the winter or summer games to compete for Belarus as an independent nation; gymnasts Olga Korbut and Vitaly Scherbo both have more medals, but Korbut competed for the Soviet Union and Scherbo only received 4 of his medals competing for Belarus; his remaining medals were won as part of the Unified Team. She was coached by former World Champion and Olympic medalist Klaus Siebert.

In September 2019, she along with her husband Ole Einar Björndalen were appointed as biathlon coaches for the Chinese team, preparing the team for the 2022 Olympic Winter Games in Beijing.

World Cup
Domracheva won the Pursuit World Cup 2011–2012 and won the Mass Start World Cup 2011–2012. In the Total World Cup 2011–2012 she ended the season second with 1188 points behind Magdalena Neuner's 1216 points.

In the 2010–2011 season Domracheva won the Mass Start World Cup.

Her biggest achievement was in the 2014–2015 when Domracheva won the Overall World Cup title with 1092 points, 48 points more than second and twice winner Kaisa Mäkäräinen. She also won the Sprint World Cup title in that season.

Overall record

* Results in all IBU World Cup races, Olympics and World Championships. Statistics as of 16 December 2007.

Record
Olympic Games6 medals (4 gold, 1 silver, 1 bronze)World Championships7 medals (2 gold, 4 silver, 1 bronze)Individual victories34 victories (9 Sp, 11 Pu, 4 In, 10 MS) * Results are from UIPMB and IBU races which include the Biathlon World Cup, Biathlon World Championships and the Winter Olympic Games.''

Personal life

Domracheva was born in Minsk. When she was four, her parents, who are architects, moved to the small town of Nyagan in Siberia. Domracheva started skiing when she was six. In cross-country ski races she was competing with boys, as she had no rivals among girls. A biathlon school was opened in Nyagan in 1999, which Domracheva attended.

Domracheva's family moved back to Minsk in 2003. There was no faculty of Sports Management in Minsk, so Domracheva changed to studying Tourism Management at the Belarusian State Economic University. In 2009, she was writing her diploma thesis on the subject: Advertising in the tourism industry. Until 2014, Domracheva was an employee of the Belarusian branch of security agency KGB, one of the few to have retained its name from the Soviet Union era.

On 5 April 2016, Norwegian biathlete Ole Einar Bjørndalen confirmed that he and Domracheva are in a relationship and that Domracheva would give birth to their first child in October 2016. They were married 16 July 2016. Domracheva gave birth to a daughter, Xenia, on 1 October 2016. She retired from competitions in June 2018 to focus on raising her daughter.

During the 2020 Belarusian protests, Domracheva called on riot police to stop using violence against protesters and to resolve conflict through peaceful means.

Film
Domracheva used a video camera to document herself, her teammates and athletes from other countries from 2008 until after the 2010 Winter Olympics in Vancouver. The 500 hours of material was edited into a 50-minute movie. The movie gives a unique insight into the life of world class athletes during the whole year, from the few weeks of relaxation and rest in the spring, through the hard training during the summer and the fall, to the competition season between December and March. The movie shows athletes from many countries, living together, traveling together and competing together.

References

External links

Official Online-store

1986 births
Living people
Belarus State Economic University alumni
Belarusian female biathletes
Biathlon World Championships medalists
Competitors at the 2007 Winter Universiade
Biathletes at the 2010 Winter Olympics
Biathletes at the 2014 Winter Olympics
Biathletes at the 2018 Winter Olympics
Holmenkollen medalists
Olympic biathletes of Belarus
Olympic gold medalists for Belarus
Olympic bronze medalists for Belarus
Olympic medalists in biathlon
Olympic silver medalists for Belarus
Medalists at the 2010 Winter Olympics
Medalists at the 2014 Winter Olympics
Medalists at the 2018 Winter Olympics
National Heroes of Belarus
Sportspeople from Minsk
Universiade gold medalists for Belarus
Universiade medalists in biathlon
Cross-country skiing coaches
Belarusian sports coaches